Franck Martial Ewane Moussima (born 23 February 1984) is a Cameroonian judoka.

Achievements

References
 

1984 births
Living people
Cameroonian male judoka
Judoka at the 2004 Summer Olympics
Judoka at the 2008 Summer Olympics
Olympic judoka of Cameroon
African Games gold medalists for Cameroon
African Games medalists in judo
Universiade medalists in judo
Competitors at the 2007 All-Africa Games
Competitors at the 2011 All-Africa Games
Universiade medalists for Cameroon
Medalists at the 2007 Summer Universiade
20th-century Cameroonian people
21st-century Cameroonian people